Major General George Byng, 3rd Viscount Torrington (21 September 1701 – 7 April 1750) (styled The Honourable George Byng from 1721 to 1747), of Southill Park in Bedfordshire, was a British Army officer and peer.

Origins
He was the 2nd surviving son of Admiral George Byng, 1st Viscount Torrington (1663–1733), of Southill Park in Bedfordshire.

Career

He succeeded his childless elder brother Pattee Byng, 2nd Viscount Torrington (1699–1747) to the viscountcy and the family seat at Southill Park in Bedfordshire.

From 1742 to 1748, Byng was Colonel of the 4th Regiment of Marines. From 1749 to 1750 he was Colonel of the 48th Regiment of Foot. He ended his military career with the rank of Major General.

Marriage and children
On 21 August 1736 he married Elizabeth Daniel, a granddaughter of Sir Peter Daniel, by whom he had two children:
 George Byng, 4th Viscount Torrington (1740–1812)
 John Byng, 5th Viscount Torrington (1743–1813)

Death and burial
He died on 7 April 1750 and was buried in the Byng Mausoleum in the Church of All Saints in Southill, Bedfordshire, built for the burial of his father.

See also 
 Viscount Torrington

References 

|-

1701 births
1750 deaths
48th Regiment of Foot officers
British Army generals
Viscounts in the Peerage of Great Britain
George